The 327th Signal Battalion (Airborne) provided worldwide rapidly deployable signal support for the Joint Task Force Headquarters, XVIII Airborne Corp and designated Major Subordinate Commands in times of peace and war. The unit was officially activated on June 30, 1952. It was deactivated in April 2007.

History
Here is an abbreviated history of the 327th Signal Battalion as gathered from various sources:

 The unit was constituted on 26 May 1952 in the Organized Reserve Corps as Headquarters and Headquarters Company, 327th Signal Support Battalion
 It was officially activated 30 June 1952 at Tampa, Florida
(Organized Reserve Corps redesignated 9 July 1952 as the Army Reserve)
 The unit was reorganized and redesignated 15 September 1953 as Headquarters and Headquarters Detachment, 327th Signal Battalion
 Inactivated 7 July 1959 at Tampa, Florida
 Withdrawn 18 April 1967 from the Army Reserve and allotted to the Regular Army
 Activated 1 August 1967 at Fort Bragg, North Carolina
 Reorganized and redesignated 16 September 1980 as Headquarters and Headquarters Company, 327th Signal Battalion; concurrently, the 416th Signal Company (see ANNEX 1) and the 221st Signal Company (see ANNEX 2)
reorganized and redesignated, respectively, as Company A and Company B, 327th Signal Battalion

 Constituted 29 August 1940 in the Regular Army as the 316th Signal Aviation Company
 Activated 20 September 1940 at Mitchel Field, New York
 Redesignated 5 March 1941 as the 316th Signal Company, Air Wing
 Redesignated 24 October 1941 as the 416th Signal Company, Aviation
 Inactivated 16 October 1945 in Italy
 Redesignated 15 December 1954 as the 416th Signal Aviation Company
 Activated 7 February 1955 at Fort Huachuca, Arizona
 Reorganized and redesignated 26 May 1961 as the 416th Signal Company
 Inactivated 2 February 1963 at Fort Huachuca, Arizona
 Activated 18 August 1965 at Fort Lee, Virginia
 Constituted 3 November 1941 in the Regular Army as the 221st Signal Depot Company
 Activated 14 August 1943 at Fort Monmouth, New Jersey
 Inactivated 20 June 1948 in Germany
 Redesignated 8 January 1952 as the 221st Signal Base Depot Company
 Activated 22 January 1952 at Atlanta, Georgia
 Reorganized and redesignated 4 October 1954 as the 221st Signal Company
 Inactivated 1 September 1965 at Sacramento, California
 Activated 1 June 1966 at Fort Monmouth, New Jersey
 Inactivated 1 July 1974 at Schofield Barracks, Hawaii
 Activated 16 September 1979 at Fort Bragg, North Carolina
 Inactivated April 2007 at Fort Bragg, North Carolina

References

Signal battalions of the United States Army